Mujuretuli is a red wine grape grown in Georgia. It is also known as Mudzhuretuli, Mudshuretuli and Keduretuli.

History
The grape is planted exclusively in its ancestral home Georgia. Since 1907, it has been blended with Aleksandrouli to make Khvanchkara wine.

Distribution and Wines
Used in Georgia to produce a varietal rosé and a medium bodied, semi-dry, chewy blend (with Alexandrouli) having good acids and claimed to have aroma flavors reminiscent of pomegranates.

Vine and Viticulture
It has long clusters of deep purple grapes.

See also 
Georgian wine
List of Georgian wine appellations

References

External links
 Picture

Red wine grape varieties
Georgian wine